Bryntirion Athletic F.C. was a Welsh football team from the Bridgend suburb of Bryntirion. In 2013, they merged with local rivals Bridgend Town to form Pen-y-Bont.

Merger
It was confirmed in 2013 that the club would merge with local rivals Bridgend Town to form Pen-y-Bont given them access to one million pounds of funding. The new club is based at Bryntirion Park and started life in Welsh Football League Division One from season 2013–14.

Club honours

League
Welsh Football League Division One
Winners: 2010–11
Welsh Football League Division Three
Winners: 2003–04
South Wales Amateur League Division One
Winners: 2002–03

Cups
Welsh Football League Cup
Runners-up: 2007–08, 2012–13

References

External links
 Club website

Defunct football clubs in Wales
Bridgend
Football clubs in Bridgend County Borough
1956 establishments in Wales
2013 disestablishments in Wales
Welsh Football League clubs
South Wales Amateur League clubs
Association football clubs established in 1956
Association football clubs disestablished in 2013